Amir Khosravani (born March 3, 1994, in Borazjan) is an Iranian Paralympic athlete. He represented Iran at the 2020 Summer Paralympics in Tokyo, Japan and won the gold medal in the Men's long jump T12 event.

References

External links 
 

1994 births
Living people
People from Bushehr Province
Paralympic athletes of Iran
Medalists at the 2020 Summer Paralympics
Athletes (track and field) at the 2020 Summer Paralympics
Paralympic gold medalists for Iran
Paralympic medalists in athletics (track and field)
Iranian long jumpers
21st-century Iranian people